Lev Sarkisov (born 2 December 1938) is an Armenian mountaineer known for being the oldest Armenian to have climbed Mount Everest.

Career
Sarkisov worked as a mentor for mountaineers in the Georgian Armed Forces before moving onto recreational climbing.

On 12 May 1999 Sarkisov became the oldest man to have ever reached the peak of Mount Everest at the age of sixty years and one hundred sixty-one days, breaking the previous record held by Venezuelan climber Ramon Balanca Suarez. He was officially recognized by the Guinness World Records as the oldest mountaineer to have ever scaled the mountain. His record was surpassed in 2001 by American mountaineer Sherman Bull.

Sarkisov was awarded the Order of Honor by President Eduard Shevardnadze in 1999 and is also a recipient of the Snow Leopard award.

See also 

 List of Mount Everest records

References

External links
  Lev Sarkisov on EverestNews

Living people
Armenian mountain climbers
Recipients of the Order of Honor (Georgia)
Place of birth missing (living people)
1938 births